Cape Cod, Massachusetts contains marine, estuarine, freshwater, and terrestrial ecosystems that provide habitats and breeding grounds for a diverse array of animals including endangered North Atlantic right whales and humpback whales. It is also home to commercial fisheries and shellfish farming operations worth millions of dollars. According to the Center for Coastal Studies, it takes about a month for the waters of the Cape Cod Bay to be completely drained and refilled, which has allowed toxic levels of nitrogen-based chemicals to build up. The main source (approximately 80%) comes from septic systems, augmented by fertilizer runoff and other forms of pollutants from nearby parking lots. This excess nitrogen (eutrophication), is linked to toxic algal blooms and depleted oxygen levels (hypoxia). Research into the problem is ongoing, with a plan to mitigate some of the damage through the expansion and/or creation of sewer systems throughout the area.

Background
In Cape Cod, small, inland ponds known as Kettle ponds and the surrounding waters of the Atlantic Ocean have become increasingly polluted over the years. The main pollutant considered to be problematic in these waters is nitrogen. The large amount of nitrogen in the water stems from the widespread use of private septic tanks in homes instead of the use of a town-owned sewer. Many towns around Cape Cod opted out of purchasing sewer systems when the federal government subsidized them in the 1960s and 70s to avoid the influx of new homeowners to the communities. However, Cape Cod's communities still grew despite the lack of public sewage systems, which resulted in the installation of many septic tanks in new homes.

The increased nitrogen levels in the waters of Cape Cod has resulted in greater amounts of algae blooming in the spring and summer months as it is a key nutrient. When the algae die, they leave a thick coat of slime on the bottom of the bays and ponds, which severely reduces the amount of shellfish and crabs able to survive on the seafloor. The algae also limit the amount of oxygen available in the water, which kills the fish living there. The algae are also the source of red tides, which have been occurring more frequently with the heightened levels of nitrogen.

To counter the problem, towns are trying to institute new programs and procedures to reduce the levels of nitrogen present in the waters of Cape Cod. The common solution that has been brought up is installing new town-wide sewer systems to prevent runoff from septic tanks reaching the waters, since sewer systems release less nitrogen into the environment than private septic tanks.

References

Cape Cod
Environmental issues in Massachusetts
Cape Cod and the Islands